Uma Shankar Bajpai (1921/1922, Jaipur – 6 February 2005) was an Indian diplomat and a veteran journalist. He was also the director of India International Centre.

Kanti Bajpai, the Indian academic, is his son.

Life and career 
Uma Shankar Bajpai was born in Jaipur. His father was Girija Shankar Bajpai (1891–1954), an eminent Indian civil servant, diplomat and Governor.

Bajpai joined the Indian Foreign Service. He was posted at the Karachi Consulate, Pakistan, for some time. Bajpai's last foreign posting was as High Commissioner of Canada. He retired as the Secretary of Ministry of Foreign Affairs. After his retirement from the Indian Foreign Service, he took the role as director of India International Centre. He is credited with revamping the institution.

Uma Shankar Bajpai died on 6 February 2005 at the age of 83.

Details 
Educated at Merton College, Oxford and Ecole des Hautes Etudes Universitaire.
1948-1952: Under Secretary, South Block.
1952-1955: First Secretary Indian Embassy in Rome.
1957-1959: First Secretary Indian Embassy in Kathmandu.
1959-1961: First Secretary Indian Embassy in Paris.
1965-1966: Minister at the Indian High Commission, London.
1966-1969: Deputy High Commissioner in Karachi.
December 1969 to October 1972: ambassador to Ankara.
October 1972-April 1977: High Commissioner to Ottawa.
30 June 1977 – 31 May 1978: ambassador to Bern.
August 1979: retirement

References 

1920s births
2005 deaths
Year of birth missing
Alumni of Merton College, Oxford
Ambassadors of India to Turkey
High Commissioners of India to Canada
Ambassadors of India to Switzerland